The Daily Hai Queen Cup (Japanese クイーンカップ) is a Grade 3 horse race for three-year-old Thoroughbred fillies run in February over a distance of 1600 metres at Tokyo Racecourse.

The race was first run in 1966 and was elevated to Grade 3 status in 1984. It was contested at variety of venues but has been run over its current course and distance since 1981. The race serves as a trial race for the Oka Sho.

Winners since 2000

Earlier winners

 1984 - Aino Feather
 1985 - Takara Steel
 1986 - Super Shot
 1987 - Nakami Julianne
 1988 - Circle Showa
 1989 - Cutting Edge
 1990 - Sweet Mithuna
 1991 - Scarlet Bouquet
 1992 - Sanei Thank You
 1993 - Mother Tosho
 1994 - Hishi Amazon
 1995 - Eishin Berlin
 1996 - Ibuki Perceive
 1997 - Orange Peel
 1998 - Edai Queen
 1999 - Umeno Fiber

See also
 Horse racing in Japan
 List of Japanese flat horse races

References

Turf races in Japan